Encants is a Barcelona Metro station in the Eixample district of Barcelona, served by L2. It opened in 1997. It is located under carrer de València between carrer del Dos de Maig and carrer de la Independència, and is accessible from both sides of the intersection of carrer de València and Dos de de Maig.

The station is named after the nearby Encants Vells and Encants Nous, two markets.

Services

See also
List of Barcelona Metro stations

External links

Trenscat.com

Railway stations in Spain opened in 1997
Transport in Eixample
Barcelona Metro line 2 stations